Ian William Finlay (born 14 May 1946 in Woking) was an English first-class cricketer active 1971–74 who played for Surrey.

See also
Cricket in England
Cricket in Ireland
Cricket in Scotland
Cricket in Wales
England cricket team
England women's cricket team
List of Surrey County Cricket Club players

References

1946 births
Living people
English cricketers
Surrey cricketers
Sportspeople from Woking